Marie of Cleves (19 September 1426 – 23 August 1487) was the third wife of Charles, Duke of Orléans. She was born a German princess, the last child of Adolph I, Duke of Cleves and his second wife, Mary of Burgundy.

Marie was a patron of letters and commissioned many works; she was also an active poet herself, producing ballads and other verses. After the Duke's death she was secretly remarried in 1480 to one of her gentlemen of the chamber, the Artesian "Sieur de Rabodanges", who was some years her junior. She died in Chaunay.

Marriage and issue
At the age of fourteen, Marie was married to 46-year-old Charles of Valois, Duke of Orléans, a man 32 years her senior, on 27 November 1440, in Saint-Omer. She became his third and last wife. Their eldest child was born fully 17 years after the wedding. They had three children together, being:
Marie of Orléans, Viscountess of Narbonne (19 December 1457 – 1493); married John of Foix, Viscount of Narbonne in 1483.
King Louis XII of France (1462–1515)
Anne of Orléans, Abbess of Fontevraud and Poitiers (1464–1491).

In literature 
Marie is a character in Hella Haasse's historical novel about Charles, Duke of Orléans In a Dark Wood Wandering (original Dutch title Het Woud der Verwachting).

Notes

References
Arn, Mary-Jo. Charles d'Orléans in England, 1415-1440. Cambridge; Rochester, NY, USA : D.S. Brewer, 2000. googlebooks Retrieved August 17, 2009
Wilson, Katharina M. An Encyclopedia of Continental Women Writers. Vol. 2  New York: Garland Pub, 1991. googlebooks
Holt, Emily Sarah. Memoirs of Royal Ladies. London : Hurst and Blackett, 1861. googlebooks

Marie
Marie
Marie
People from the Duchy of Cleves
1426 births
1487 deaths
15th-century French people
15th-century French women